There have been several Norwegian Antarctic expeditions:

 Jason Expeditions (1892–1894), led by Carl Anton Larsen
 Antarctic Expedition (1894–1895), led by Henrik Johan Bull
 Amundsen's South Pole expedition (1910–1912)
 Norvegia Expeditions (1927–1931), sponsored by Lars Christensen
 Thorshavn Expeditions, 1931–1937, sponsored by Lars Christensen
 Brategg Expedition (1948); see Peter I Island
Norwegian–British–Swedish Antarctic Expedition, 1949–1952
Sixth Norwegian Antarctic Expedition (1956–1960) (NAX)
Norwegian-U.S. Scientific Traverse of East Antarctica, 2007–2008